is a Japanese voice actor from Fukuoka, Japan who is an affiliate of Mausu Promotion.

Personal life
In 1996, Hamada enrolled at Ezaki Production school. Since 1998, he has been affiliated with Mausu Promotion. He has admitted that he has been a heavy smoker since high school, but as of 2014 he has quit smoking.

Hamada has been married to fellow voice actress Junko Takeuchi since 2006 with whom he has two children.

Filmography

Television animation
1998
Fancy Lala – Nishiyama

1999
Devil Lady – Arito
Dual! Parallel Trouble Adventure – Toshihiko Izawa

2000
Saiyuki – Silver-haired Demon

2001
Geneshaft – Mario Musicanova
Star Ocean EX – "La"

2002
Aquarian Age: Sign for Evolution – Akane's Manager (ep 7)
Duel Masters – Kirifuda's Father
Heat Guy J – Blood

2003
Gungrave – Harry MacDowel (Teen)
Green Green – Taizou Tenjin
Mujin Wakusei Survive – Luna's Father

2004
Uta∽Kata – Masahito Tachibana
Dan Doh!! – Owner
Tenjho Tenge – Tsutomu Ryuuzaki
Naruto – Shibi Aburame (ep 79)
Daphne in the Brilliant Blue – Trevor

2005
Agatha Christie no Meitantei Poirot to Marple – Inspector Craddock (ep 23)
Eyeshield 21 – Ichiro Takami
Gallery Fake – Parker (ep 37), Winston (ep 6)
Guyver: The Bioboosted Armor – Noskov
Onegai My Melody – Papa
Zettai Shonen – Akiyuki Kishiro
Naruto – Fugaku Uchiha
Honey and Clover – Takumi Nomiya
Paradise Kiss – Jouji "George" Koizumi
Lamune – Tae's Father

2006
Kiba – Miguel
Gin-iro no Olynssis – Mason
Gintama – Kitaouji Itsuki
Ghost Hunt – Hōshō Takigawa
Sasami: Magical Girls Club – Ginji Iwakura
Le Chevalier D'Eon – Bernice
Ghost Slayers Ayashi – Masahiro Abe
Tokyo Tribe 2 – Ago, Kai's Father (ep 1)
NANA – Mizukoshi
Honey and Clover II – Takumi Nomiya
Pumpkin Scissors – Ian (ep 7)
Mushi-Shi – Taku (Older)
Yume Tsukai – Mizuki Fuyumura (ep 7)
Megaman Star Force – Michinori Ikuta

2007
Ef a tale of memories – Shūichi Kuze
Kishin Taisen Gigantic Formula – Yashichi Yanagisawa
Mobile Suit Gundam 00 – Patrick Colasour, Commander Kim (ep 4)
Claymore – Dauf, Man in Black
Shigurui: Death Frenzy – Iemon Shigaraki
Hayate the Combat Butler – Hayate's Father
Harukanaru Toki no Naka de 3: Kurenai no Tsuki – Taira no Tomomori
Buso Renkin – Shinobu Negoro
Potemayo – Kōdai Moriyama
Mushi-Uta – Kabuto

2008
Real Drive – Yuujin
Ef a tale of melodies – Shūichi Kuze
Chaos;HEAd – Issei Hatano
Mobile Suit Gundam 00 Second Season – Patrick Colasour, Commander Kim
Gegege no Kitarō – Higomo (ep 74), Tsuki (ep 49)
Skip Beat! – Takenori Sawara
Birdy the Mighty: Decode – Kashu Geeze
Natsume's Book of Friends – Adult Akifumi Sugino
Chiko, Heiress of the Phantom Thief – Akechi (ep 3)
Top Secret ~The Revelation~ – Takashi Soga

2009
Sweet Blue Flowers – Masanori Kakumu
Slap Up Party: Arad Senki – Aganzo
CANAAN – Minoru Minorikawa
Guin Saga – Taeron
Kurokami The Animation – Hiyou
Cross Game – Tadashi Shimano
Gegege no Kitarō – Senior Tanaka (ep 91)
Hell Girl: Three Vessels – Ashiya Risaburo (Teen, ep 17)
07-Ghost – Hyuuga
Shangri-La – Karin's Father
The Book of Bantorra – Zatoh Rondohoon
Tears to Tiara – Gaius
Naruto: Shippuden – Fugaku Uchiha
Fullmetal Alchemist: Brotherhood – Vato Falman, Barry the Chopper (real body)
Basquash! – James Ron
Bleach – Hyorinmaru
Modern Magic Made Simple – Gary Huang
One Piece – Killer

2010
The Betrayal Knows My Name – Fuyutoki Kureha
Ookiku Furikabutte ~Natsu no Taikai-hen~ – Roka Nakazawa
High School of the Dead – Matsuo
Psychic Detective Yakumo – Shunsuke Takeda
Stitch! – Clyde
The Qwaser of Stigmata – Wang Chen
Dance in the Vampire Bund – Rozenmann
Naruto Shippuden – Shibi Aburame
Fullmetal Alchemist: Brotherhood – Bliss
Bakuman. – Tarō Kawaguchi
Battle Spirits: Brave – The Hooligan General Duc
Harukanaru Toki no Naka de 3: Owari Naki Unmei – Shirogane, Tomomori Taira
One Piece – Inazuma (Male)

2011
Heaven's Memo Pad – Masaya Kusakabe
Shakugan no Shana III – Ernest Frieder
The Qwaser of Stigmata II – Wan Chen
Chihayafuru – Kenji Ayase
Bakuman. 2 – Tarō Kawaguchi
Hanasaku Iroha – Enishi Shijima
Manyū Hiken-chō – Muneyuki Manyū
Un-Go – Yasuo Saburi
One Piece – Atmos

2012
Initial D: Fifth Stage – Kobayakawa
The Ambition of Oda Nobuna – Sugitani Zenjuubou
Cardfight!! Vanguard: Asia Circuit Hen – Brutal Jack
Mobile Suit Gundam AGE – Andy Draims
Kingdom – Feng Ji
Kuroko's Basketball – Teppei Kiyoshi
Sakamichi no Apollon – Yurika's Father
Tari Tari – Keisuke Sakai
Muv-Luv Alternative: Total Eclipse – Valerio Giacosa
Pokémon: Black and White – Fujio
Rinne no Lagrange – Hiroshi Nakaizumi

2013
Sunday Without God – Lex
Galilei Donna – Hans 
Gifū Dōdō!! Kanetsugu to Keiji – Shima Sakon
Genshiken: Second Generation – Yuichiro Hato 
Chihayafuru 2 – Kenji Ayase
Toriko – Zaus
Namiuchigiwa no Muromi-san – Kawabata-kun
Bakuman. 3 – Tarō Kawaguchi
Hunter × Hunter (2011) – Bara, Kess
Pokémon XY – Barry 
Yu-Gi-Oh! Zexal II – Eliphas
Little Busters! – Shō Saigusa
Ro-Kyu-Bu! SS – Banri Kashii

2014
Oneechan ga Kita – Masaya Mizuhara
Girl Friend BETA – Serge Jean Lemaire
Aikatsu! - Sergeant Pepper
The Kindaichi Case Files Returns – Ryuuta Takigawa/Wang Long Tai
Gekkan Shōjo Nozaki-kun – John 
Battle Spirits Saikyō Ginga Ultimate Zero – Ultimate-Beelzebeat
Black Butler: Book of Circus – Diederich
Argevollen – Lorenz Giuliano
Shirobako – Masashi Yamada
Nobunaga Concerto – Saito Yoshitatsu
HappinessCharge PreCure! – Madam Momere 
Ping Pong – Masayuki Sanada
The Irregular at Magic High School – Kotaro Tatsumi
Lord Marksman and Vanadis – Steed
Your Lie in April – Takahiko Arima 

2015
Magic Kaito 1412 – Jack Connery 
World Trigger – Haruaki Azuma
Kuroko's Basketball – Teppei Kiyoshi
Gangsta – Hausen 
Comet Lucifer – Gus Stewart

2016
 JoJo's Bizarre Adventure: Diamond Is Unbreakable – Anjuro "Angelo" Katagiri
 Tōken Ranbu: Hanamaru – Otegine  (ep 7-)
 Norn9 – Shiro Yuiga
 BBK/BRNK – Yūki Nono
 Boku Dake ga Inai Machi – Kitamura
 91 Days – Tigre
 Taboo Tattoo – Johnson

2017
 Onihei – Yūsuke Sakai
 Hell Girl: Fourth Twilight – Kazuomi Kogure
 A Centaur's Life – Sōta Kimihara
 Alice & Zōroku – Kirk Herschel
 Super Lovers 2 – Kazushi Mori
 In Another World With My Smartphone – Baba Nobuharu
 Idol Incidents – Togiria
 Tomica Hyper Rescue Drive Head Kidō Kyūkyū Keisatsu – Jō Kurumada

2018
 Hakata Tonkotsu Ramens - Shigematsu
 Sword Gai The Animation - Tatsumi
 Gundam Build Divers - Patrick Colasour (ep. 11)

2019
Attack on Titan Season 3 Part 2 - Xaver
Cop Craft - Jack Roth

2020
In/Spectre - Tokunosuke Terada
Healin' Good Pretty Cure - Kyosei Maruyama
The God of High School - Commissioner Q

2021
Odd Taxi - Dob
Seirei Gensouki: Spirit Chronicles - Alfred Emerle
Platinum End - Mirai's Father

2022
Salaryman's Club - Hajime Masatoki
Spriggan - Yamamoto
I've Somehow Gotten Stronger When I Improved My Farm-Related Skills - Gilles Wayne

2023
Chillin' in My 30s After Getting Fired from the Demon King's Army - Enbil

Films
Sing a Bit of Harmony (2021) - Nomiyama
To Every You I've Loved Before (2022)
To Me, The One Who Loved You (2022)

Original video animation (OVA)
Shirobako (2015) – Lye (ep 2)
The Kubikiri Cycle (2016) – Shinya Sakaki
Moriarty the Patriot (2022) – Baron George Cubid

Drama CDs
Etrian Odyssey – Alan/Protector #3
Honey Boys Spiral – Tsukasa Kozuki
Koi Made Hyakurin – Toraji Oyama
Saudade – Leon Canales Serrano
Magical Girl Lyrical Nanoha INNOCENT - Granz Florian

Tokusatsu
Tokusou Sentai Dekaranger – Dynamoian Terry X (ep. 47)
GoGo Sentai Boukenger – Hyouga (ep. 17)
Engine Sentai Go-onger – Engine Gunpherd (eps. 3 - 47, 49)
Engine Sentai Go-onger: Boom Boom! Bang Bang! GekijōBang!! – Engine Gunpherd
Engine Sentai Go-onger vs. Gekiranger – Engine Gunpherd
Samurai Sentai Shinkenger vs. Go-onger: GinmakuBang!! – Engine Gunpherd
Kamen Rider × Kamen Rider OOO & W Featuring Skull: Movie War Core – Kyoryu Greeed
Kamen Rider × Kamen Rider Fourze & OOO: Movie War Mega Max – Kamen Rider Poseidon
Unofficial Sentai Akibaranger – Shibuya Seitakaawadachisohigenagaaburamushi (ep. 1), Shibuya Kouzorinahigenagaaburamushi (ep. 2)
Ressha Sentai ToQger – Seal Shadow (ep. 7)
Shuriken Sentai Ninninger – Puppet Ninja Kuroari  (ep. 30)
Uchu Sentai Kyuranger – Southern King  (ep. 41)

Video games
Collar x Malice - Tomoki Ogata
Dynasty Warriors 9 - Xun You
Tales of Symphonia: Dawn of the New World - Richter Abend
Reijou Tantei Office no Jikenbo - Sagami Sou
Warriors Orochi 3 - Susano'o
Warriors Orochi 4 - Susano'o
Final Fantasy XIV - Estinien Wyrmblood
Yakuza 5 - Yahata
Lost Judgment - Daimu Akutsu
Soul Hackers 2 - Raven
Super Street Fighter IV - Dee Jay
Street Fighter 6 - Dee Jay

Dubbing

Live-action
Paul Rudd
The 40-Year-Old Virgin – David
Knocked Up – Pete
Forgetting Sarah Marshall – Chuck / Kunu
This Is 40 – Pete
200 Cigarettes – Elvis Costello
20,000 Leagues Under the Sea – Pierre Arronax (Patrick Dempsey)
Agatha Christie's Poirot – Oliver Manders (Tom Wisdom)
Aliens in the Attic – Jake Pearson (Austin Butler)
American Pie film series – Chuck "Sherminator" Sherman (Chris Owen)
Armageddon – NASA Tech (Matt Malloy)
Bicentennial Man – Lloyd Charney (Bradley Whitford)
Black Cadillac – Scott (Shane Johnson)
Body of Proof – Tom Parker (Stephen Barker Turner)
Bohemian Rhapsody – Kenny Everett (Dickie Beau)
The Boondock Saints – Officer Chaffey
The Brothers Bloom – Bloom (Adrien Brody)
Daredevil – James Wesley (Toby Leonard Moore)
Dark Angel – Zack (William Gregory Lee)
Deadpool – Francis Freeman/Ajax (Ed Skrein)
Diana – Jason Fraser
Dr. Dolittle 2 (2005 TV Tokyo edition) – Eric (Lil Zane)
Enemy of the State (2003 Fuji TV edition) – Jamie Williams (Jamie Kennedy)
A Good Man – Sasha (Victor Webster)
The Grand Budapest Hotel – Dmitri Desgoffe und Taxis (Adrien Brody), Young Writer (Jude Law)
The Grey – John Diaz (Frank Grillo)
Instinct – Julian Cousins (Naveen Andrews)
Jakob the Liar – Preuss (Justus von Dohnányi)
Just Go with It – Ian Maxtone-Jones (Dave Matthews)
Kissing Jessica Stein – Greg (Michael Ealy)
LAX – Tony Magulia (Paul Leyden)
Legally Blonde – Warner Huntington III (Matthew Davis)
Legally Blondes – Mr. Richard Woods (Christopher Cousins)
Limitless – Edward "Eddie" Morra (Bradley Cooper)
Love and Other Disasters – Hollywood Paolo (Santiago Cabrera)
Magnolia – Todd Geronimo (Patrick Warren)
The Martian – Dr. Chris Beck (Sebastian Stan)
Northmen: A Viking Saga – Asbjörn (Tom Hopper)
Octane – The Father (Jonathan Rhys Meyers)
One Night Stand – Nathan
Overlord – Corporal Lewis Ford (Wyatt Russell)
The Pink Panther – Bizu (William Abadie)
Platoon (2003 TV Tokyo edition) – Crawford (Chris Pedersen)
Poseidon – Marco Valentin (Freddy Rodriguez)
Prozac Nation – Noah (Jonathan Rhys Meyers)
Saving Private Ryan – Paratrooper Joe (Nick Brooks)
The Skulls – Will Beckford (Hill Harper)
Spin City – James Hobert (Alexander Chaplin)
Star Trek: Enterprise – Travis Mayweather (Anthony Montgomery)
The Suspect (Warner Bros Japan) – Ji Dong-chul (Gong Yoo)
Thanks of a Grateful Nation – Chris Small (Matt Keeslar)
Tigerland – Barnes
Universal Soldier III: Unfinished Business – Charles Clifton (Juan Chioran)
Urban Legends: Final Cut – Rob (Yani Gellman)
Velvet Goldmine – Freddi (David Hoyle)
Wishcraft – Brett Bumpers (Michael Weston)

Animation
The Batman – Rumor
Cybersix – Techno
Waking Life – Jesse

References

External links
Kenji Hamada's profile at Mausu Promotion's website 

1972 births
Male voice actors from Fukuoka Prefecture
Japanese male video game actors
Japanese male voice actors
Living people
20th-century Japanese male actors
21st-century Japanese male actors
Mausu Promotion voice actors